Valentin Sinescu (born 16 July 1963) is a Romanian football manager and former footballer. As a footballer, Sinescu played for Astra Ploiești in the lower leagues, during the 1980s and 1990s. In parallel with his football career, Sinescu studied petrochemical engineering and then worked as an engineer at the Ploiești Refinery, hence his nickname, "the engineer".

Since 1997, he started to work as an assistant manager for Astra Ploiești, club for which he was also a caretaker manager, secretary, translator, youth coach and manager in the next 15 years. Sinescu made its debut in the Liga I as a manager in 1999, when for a short period was the caretaker manager of "The Black Devils", then in 2012 he also debuted as a (full) manager in the top-flight, for the same club. Sinescu also worked for teams such as FC Argeș Pitești, Oțelul Galați, Petrolul Ploiești or Unirea Dej, among others.

Valentin Sinescu is well known in the Romanian football for his elevated speech and for the fact that he also speaks several foreign languages fluently. These qualities recommended him for a job as a professor at the Football Managers School of the Romanian Football Federation, but also gave him two new nicknames "the philosopher" or "the professor".

References

External links
 

1963 births
Living people
Sportspeople from Ploiești
Romanian footballers
Liga II players
Liga III players
FC Astra Giurgiu players
Romanian football managers
FC Astra Giurgiu managers
FC Argeș Pitești managers
FC Petrolul Ploiești managers
FC Unirea Dej managers
CSM Unirea Alba Iulia managers
Association footballers not categorized by position